Exultation! is an album by American jazz saxophonist Booker Ervin featuring performances recorded in 1963 for the Prestige label. It was first released in 1963, then reissued in 1971 with two alternate takes labeled "short version" (the a- and b-sides of a 1963 single, "No Land's Man" backed with "Just in Time").

Reception
The Allmusic review by Scott Yanow awarded the album 4 stars and stated "Ervin and Strozier made a mutually inspiring team; pity that this was their only recording together".

Track listing
All compositions by Booker Ervin except as indicated
 "Mooche Mooche" - 7:18
 "Black and Blue" (Harry Brooks, Andy Razaf, Fats Waller) - 6:19
 "Mour" (Perkins) - 4:08
 "Just in Time" (Jule Styne, Betty Comden, Adolph Green) - 2:29 # "Just in Time" [Long Take] (Styne, Comden, Green) - 4:55
 "No Land's Man" (Booker Ervin, Walter Perkins) - 2:38 
 "Tune In" - 8:32

Personnel
Booker Ervin - tenor saxophone
Frank Strozier - alto saxophone
Horace Parlan - piano
Butch Warren - bass
Walter Perkins - drums

References 

Prestige Records albums
Booker Ervin albums
1963 albums
Albums recorded at Van Gelder Studio
Albums produced by Don Schlitten